Marfa Independent School District is a public school district based in Marfa, Texas (USA).

In addition to Marfa, the district also serves the CDP of Redford, and the unincorporated communities of Plata and Shafter.

In 2009, the school district was rated "academically acceptable" by the Texas Education Agency.

Schools
Marfa Junior/Senior High School (Grades 7-12)
Marfa Elementary School (Grades PK-6)
Blackwell School (former)

Special programs

Athletics
Marfa High School plays six-man football.

References

External links
Marfa ISD

School districts in Presidio County, Texas
Marfa, Texas